Arenaria peploides can refer to:

Arenaria peploides L., a synonym of Honckenya peploides (L.) Ehrh.
Arenaria peploides Lapeyr., a synonym of Polycarpon polycarpoides (Biv.) Zodda